List of giants may refer to:

 List of giants in mythology and folklore
 List of tallest people
 List of megafauna in mythology and folklore